Getting Away from It All is a 1972 American made-for-television comedy film directed by Lee Philips and starring Larry Hagman, Barbara Feldon, Gary Collins, Jim Backus, Vivian Vance, and Burgess Meredith. It was aired on January 18, 1972 in the ABC Movie of the Week space.

Plot

Cast
Larry Hagman as Fred Clark
Barbara Feldon as Helen Clark
Gary Collins as Mark Selby
Jim Backus as Mike Lorimar
Vivian Vance as May Brodey
Burgess Meredith as Captain Frank Coffin
Paul Hartman as Hank, the Postman
J. Pat O'Malley as Jeremiah
Melissa Newman as April Brodey
Randy Quaid as Herbie
John Qualen as Charlie Erickson
Hal Smith as Jeb
Rosalie Williams as Rose Malone
Charlotte Knight as Sarah
Jason Wingreen as Eben
Marjorie Bennett as Madeline Erickson
Joe E. Ross as Cab Driver
Allen Jenkins as Doorman
Dick Wilson as Kirk Lecount
Bonnie Kammerman as Tourist
Carol Speed as Town Clerk
E.J. Peaker as Alice Selby

References

External links

Films scored by Vic Mizzy
1972 television films
1972 films
ABC Movie of the Week
1972 comedy films
American comedy films
1970s English-language films
Films directed by Lee Philips
1970s American films